Tricky may refer to:

Arts and entertainment
 Tricky (TV series), a Saturday morning ITV children's television series
 "Tricky, Tricky", a song by Lou Bega
 Tricky TV, an ITV children's television magic series
 SSX Tricky, the second game in the SSX series
 Prince Tricky, a character in the Star Fox series of video games
"It's Tricky", a song by Run-DMC

People
 Tricky (musician) (born 1968), English producer and trip hop musician
 Tricky Nichols (1850–1897), American baseball pitcher
 Tricky Stewart (born 1974), American music producer

Other uses
 Tricky Hill, a summit in Missouri, US

See also
 Trick (disambiguation)
 Tricky Business (disambiguation)
 Tricky Dicky (disambiguation)